The 2003 World's Strongest Man was the 26th edition of World's Strongest Man and was won by Mariusz Pudzianowski from Poland. It was his second title, and Pudzianowski's record-setting score of 66 points in the Final eclipsed the previous record of 60. His margin of victory (20 points) was also a record. The contest was held at Victoria Falls, Zambia.

Qualifying heats

Heat 1

events: Farmer's Walk, Squat Lift with Barrels Machine, Train Pull, Atlas Stones, Log Lift Ladder, Tyre Flip

Heat 2

Levi Vaoga was originally in this heat but could not go to Zambia, and he was replaced by Heinz Ollesch.

events: Carry & Flip (Duck Walk & Tyre Flip), Squat Lift with Barrels Machine, Train Pull, Giant Farmer's Walk, Atlas Stones, Tyre Flip

Heat 3

events: Farmer's Walk, Train Pull, Car Dead Lift for reps, Atlas Stones, Log Lift Ladder, Tyre Flip

Heat 4

events: Farmer's Walk, Squat Lift with Barrels Machine; Train Pull, Atlas Stones, Log Lift Ladder, Tyre Flip

Heat 5

Juha-Matti Räsänen was supposed to be in this heat but injured his bicep just before the contest. He was replaced by Malone Horn.

Carry & Flip (Duck Walk & Tyre Flip), Train Pull, Giant Farmer's Walk, Car Dead Lift for reps, Atlas Stones, Tyre Flip

Final results

events: Carry & Drag (Duck Walk & Drag Chain & Anchor), Log Lift Ladder, Hercules Hold, Atlas Stones, Train Pull, Dead Lift with Barrels Machine, Farmer's Walk

References

External links
 Official site

2003 in sports
World's Strongest Man